Antidesma cruciforme is a species of plant in the family Phyllanthaceae. It is endemic to Peninsular Malaysia.

References

cruciforme
Endemic flora of Peninsular Malaysia
Conservation dependent plants
Taxonomy articles created by Polbot